Joshua Newton Freeman (October 6, 1816 – November 22, 1912) was a merchant and political figure in Nova Scotia, Canada. He represented Queens in the House of Commons of Canada from 1887 to 1891 as a Liberal-Conservative member.

He was born in Liverpool, Nova Scotia. Freeman was married three times: to Sarah Elizabeth, the daughter of Queen's County MLA John Campbell, to Elizabeth Moody and to the widow Mary Mills. Freeman was high sheriff for Queens County from 1864 to 1882. He was an unsuccessful candidate for the House of Commons in 1882 and 1891.

References 
 
'The Canadian parliamentary companion, 1889'', JA Gemmill

1816 births
1912 deaths
Conservative Party of Canada (1867–1942) MPs
Members of the House of Commons of Canada from Nova Scotia